Indian Railways (IR) is a statutory body under the ownership of the Ministry of Railways, Government of India that operates India's national railway system.

In 2020, Indian Railways carried 808.6 crore (8.086 billion) passengers and in 2022, Railways transported 1418.1 million tonnes of freight. It runs 13,169 passenger trains daily, on both long-distance and suburban routes, covering 7,325 stations across India.

In the freight segment, IR runs 8,479 trains daily.

, Indian Railways' rolling stock consisted of 2,93,077 freight wagons, 76,608 passenger coaches and 12,729 locomotives. IR owns locomotive and coach-production facilities at several locations in India. It had 1.254 million employees , making it the world's fourteenth-largest employer. The government has committed to electrifying India's entire rail network by 2023–24, and become a "net zero (carbon emissions) railway" by 2030.

History 

The first railway proposals for India were made in Madras in 1832. The country's first transport train, Red Hill Railroad (built by Arthur Cotton to transport granite for road-building), ran from Red Hills to the Chintadripet bridge in Madras in 1836-1837. In 1845, the Godavari Dam Construction Railway was built by Cotton at Dowleswaram in Rajahmundry, to supply stone for the construction of a dam over the Godavari River. In 1851, the Solani Aqueduct Railway was built by Proby Cautley in Roorkee to transport construction materials for an aqueduct over the Solani River. These railway tracks were dismantled after these projects were completed and no longer exist.

The Thane viaducts, India's first railway bridges, were built over the Thane creek when the Mumbai-Thane line was extended to Kalyan in May 1854. Eastern India's first passenger train ran  from Howrah, near Kolkata, to Hoogly on 15 August 1854. The first passenger train in South India ran  from Royapuram-Veyasarapady (Madras) to Wallajaroad (Arcot) on 1 July 1856.

On 24 February 1873, a horse-drawn  tram opened in Calcutta between Sealdah and Armenian Ghat Street. On 9 May 1874, a horse-drawn tramway began operation in Bombay between Colaba and Parel. In 1879, the Nizam's Guaranteed State Railway was established which built several railway lines across the then Hyderabad State with Kachiguda Railway Station serving as its headquarters. In 1897, lighting in passenger coaches was introduced by many railway companies. On 3 February 1925, the first electric passenger train in India ran between Victoria Terminus and Kurla.

The organization of Indian railways into regional zones began in 1951, when the Southern (14 April 1951), Central (5 November 1951), and Western (5 November 1951) zones were created. Fans and lights were mandated for all compartments in all passenger classes in 1951, and sleeping accommodations were introduced in coaches. In 1956, the first fully air-conditioned train was introduced between Howrah and Delhi (Presently known as Poorva Express). Ten years later, the first containerised freight service began between Mumbai and Ahmedabad. In 1974, Indian Railways endured a 20 day strike, which damaged the nation's economy.

In 1986, computerized ticketing and reservations were introduced in New Delhi. In 1988, the first Shatabdi Express was introduced between New Delhi and Jhansi; it was later extended to Bhopal. Two years later, the first self-printing ticket machine (SPTM) was introduced in New Delhi. In 1993, air-conditioned three-tier coaches and a sleeper class (separate from second class) were introduced on IR. The CONCERT system of computerized reservations was deployed in New Delhi, Mumbai and Chennai in September 1996. In 1998, coupon validating machines (CVMs) were introduced at Mumbai Chhatrapati Shivaji Maharaj Terminus. The nationwide concierge system began operation on 18 April 1999. In February 2000, the Indian Railways website went online. Individuals can book reserved tickets in online through Indian Railways Catering and Tourism Corporation's (IRCTC) official website (www.irctc.co.in). On 3 August 2002, IR began online train reservations and ticketing. The Railway Budget was usually presented two days before the Union budget every year till 2016. The central government approved merger of the Rail and General budgets from next year, ending a 92-year-old practice of a separate budget for the nation's largest transporter. On 31 March 2017, Indian Railways announced that the country's entire rail network would be electrified by 2022 or 2023, and become a net-zero (carbon emission) railway by 2030.

On 22 March 2020, Indian Railways announced a nationwide shutdown of passenger rail service to combat the COVID-19 pandemic in India. This became part of a nationwide lockdown to slow the spread of the novel coronavirus. The railway shutdown was initially scheduled to last from 23 to 31 March, but the nationwide lockdown, as announced by Prime Minister Narendra Modi on 24 March, was to last 21 days. The national rail network is maintaining its freight operations during the lockdown, to transport essential goods. On 29 March, Indian Railways announced that it would start service for special parcel trains to transport essential goods, in addition to regular freight service. The national rail operator has also announced plans to convert coaches into isolation wards for patients of COVID-19. The railways have since reopened are currently functioning in 2022.

Organisation

Structure 

Indian Railways is headed by a Four-member Railway Board whose chairman reports to the Ministry of Railways. The Railway Board also acts as the Ministry of Railways. The officers manning the office of Railway Board are mostly from organised Group A Railway Services and Railway Board Secretariat Service. IR is divided into 18 zones, headed by general managers who report to the Railway Board. The zones are further subdivided into 71 operating divisions, headed by divisional railway managers (DRM). The divisional officers of the engineering, mechanical, electrical, signal and telecommunication, stores, accounts, personnel, operating, commercial, security and safety branches report to their respective DRMs and are tasked with the operation and maintenance of assets. Station masters control individual stations and train movements through their stations' territory. In addition, there are a number of production units, training establishments, public sector enterprises and other offices working under the control of the Railway Board.

Human resources 

Staff are classified into gazetted (Groups A and B) and non-gazetted (Groups C and D) employees. Gazetted employees carry out executive / managerial / officer level tasks. As of March 2017, the number of personnel (Groups A & B) constitutes 1.2% of the total strength, while Group C & D account for 92.6%  and 6.2% respectively.

There is no direct recruitment of Group B employees in Indian Railways and they are recruited by departmental promotional exams of Group C employees. In consultation with the UPSC and DoPT, Ministry of Railways has announced that, starting in 2023, the UPSC will conduct an exam (the IRMS Exam) as the means of recruiting candidates for the Indian Railway Management Service, or IRMS. 8 out of 10 Group-A Indian Railway services will be combined into the new IRMS, or Indian Railways Management Service, according to a gazette notification released by the Central Government. Recruitment of Group C junior engineers and depot material superintendents is conducted by the Railway Recruitment Board. Group C employees are recruited by 21 Railway Recruitment Board or RRB, which are controlled by the Railway Recruitment Control Board (RRCB). Group D staffs are recruited by 16 Railway Recruitment Cells or RRCs.

The training of all groups is shared among seven centralized zonal training institutes and 295 training centers all over India.

IR offers housing and runs its own hospitals, schools and sports facilities for the welfare of its staff.

Subsidiaries 
Following is the list of public sector undertakings (PSUs) and other organizations in which Indian Railways has a stake and are related to rail transport in India:

Other bodies

Rolling stock

Locomotives 

By 1990s, steam locomotives were phased out and electric and diesel locomotives, along with a few CNG (compressed natural gas) locomotives are used. Steam locomotives are used only in heritage trains. Locomotives in India are classified by gauge, motive power, the work they are suited for, and their power or model number. Their four- or five-letter class name includes this information. The first letter denotes the track gauge, the second their motive power (diesel or electric), and the third their suitable traffic (goods, passenger, multi or shunting). The fourth letter denoted the locomotive's chronological model number, but in 2002, a new classification was adopted in which the fourth letter in newer diesel locomotives indicate horsepower range.

A locomotive may have a fifth letter in its name, denoting a technical variant, subclass, or sub-type (a variation in the basic model (or series) or a different motor or manufacturer). In the new diesel-locomotive classification, the fifth letter refines the horsepower in 100-hp increments: A for 100 hp, B for 200 hp, C for 300 hp and so on. In this classification, a WDM-3A is a 3100 hp, a WDM-3D a 3400 hp and a WDM-3F a 3600 hp locomotive. Diesel locomotives are fitted with auxiliary power units, which saves almost 88 percent of fuel during the idle time when a train is not running.

Presently Indian Railways rolling stock (bogies) are being manufactured by ICF, MCF and RCF. Where as Locomotives are manufactured by Chittaranjan Locomotives, Banaras Locomotive Works, Patiala Locomotives Works. All these are owned and operated by Railways Department. But Indian Railways also procure rolling stocks from BEML and BHEL which are other government organizations.

Goods wagons 

A new wagon numbering system was adopted in Indian Railways in 2003. Wagons are allocated 11 digits, making it easy for identification and computerization of a wagon's information. The first two digits indicate Type of Wagon, the third and fourth digits indicate Owning Railway, the fifth and sixth digits indicate Year of Manufacture, the seventh to tenth digits indicate Individual Wagon Number, and the last digit is a Check digit.

IR's bulk requirement of wagons is met by wagon manufacturing units both in public and private sectors as well as other Public Sector Units under the administrative control of Ministry of Railways.

Passenger coaches 

On long-distance routes and also on some shorter routes, IR uses two primary types of coach design types. ICF coach, in production from 1955 until Jan 2018, constitute the bulk of the current stock. These coaches, considered to be having inadequate safety features, are slowly being phased out. As of September 2017, around 40,000 coaches are still in operation. These coaches are being replaced with LHB coach.

IR has introduced new electric multiple unit (EMU) train sets for long-distance routes. One such, Train-18 is under operation and another, Train-20 is expected to run from 2020. These train sets are expected to replace locomotive-hauled trains on long-distance routes.

On regional short-distance routes, IR runs Mainline electrical multiple unit (MEMU) or Diesel electrical multiple unit (DEMU) trains, depending on the traction available. These train sets are self-propelled with capability for faster acceleration or deceleration and are expected to reduce congestion on dense routes. Passenger locomotive-hauled trains, having frequent stops, are slowly being replaced with train sets across India.

On suburban commuter routes around the large urban centers, IR runs trains with normal electric multiple unit (EMU) coaches. These are popularly called as "local trains" or simply "locals".

Manufacturing 
Indian Railways is a vertically integrated organization that produces majority of its locomotives & rolling stock at in-house production units, with a few recent exceptions.

Locomotives:
 Chittaranjan Locomotive Works in Chittaranjan, West Bengal manufactures electric locomotives.
 Banaras Locomotive Works in Varanasi, Uttar Pradesh manufactures electric locomotives.
 Diesel Locomotive Factory, Marhowrah, Bihar, a Joint Venture of Indian Railways & General Electric manufactures high capacity diesel locomotives, used especially for freight transportation.
 Electric Locomotive Factory in Madhepura, Bihar, a Joint Venture of Indian Railways and Alstom SA manufactures electric locomotives.
Patiala Locomotive Works in Patiala, Punjab upgrades and overhauls locomotives. They also manufacture electric locomotives

Rolling Stock:
 Integral Coach Factory in Perambur, Tamil Nadu
 Rail Coach Factory in Kapurthala, Punjab
 Modern Coach Factory in Raebareli, Uttar Pradesh
 Marathwada Rail Coach Factory in Latur, Maharashtra

Wheel & Axle:

 Rail Wheel Factory in Bengaluru, Karnataka
 Rail Wheel Plant in Chhapra, Bihar

The repair and maintenance of this vast fleet of rolling stock is carried out at 44 loco sheds, 212 carriage & wagon repair units and 45 periodic overhaul workshops across various zones of IR.

Network

Tracks 

All of the broad-gauge network is equipped with long-welded, high-tensile strength 52kg/60kg 90 UTS rails and pre-stressed concrete (PSC) sleepers with elastic fastenings.

 broad gauge is the gauge used by IR and spans almost the entire network as of March 31, 2022. It is the broadest gauge in use across the world for regular passenger movement.

Electrification 

Indian Railway uses 25 kV 50 Hz AC traction on all its electrified tracks.

Railway electrification in India began with the first electric train, between Chhatrapati Shivaji Terminus and Kurla on the Harbour Line, on 3 February 1925 on the Great Indian Peninsula Railway (GIPR) at 1500 V DC. Heavy gradients in the Western Ghats necessitated the introduction of electric traction on the GIPR to Igatpuri on the North East line and Pune on the South East line. On 5 January 1928 1500 V DC traction was introduced on the suburban section of the Bombay, Baroda and Central India Railway between Colaba and Borivili, and between Madras Beach and Tambaram of the Madras and Southern Mahratta Railway on 11 May 1931, to meet growing traffic needs. The 3000 V DC electrification of the Howrah-Burdwan section of the Eastern Railway was completed in 1958. The first 3000 V DC EMU service began on the Howrah-Sheoraphuli section on 14 December 1957.

Research and trials in Europe, particularly on French Railways (SNCF), indicated that 25 kV AC was an economical electrification system. Indian Railways decided in 1957 to adopt 25 kV AC as its standard, with SNCF their consultant in the early stages. The first 25 kV AC section was Raj Kharswan–Dongoaposi on the South Eastern Railway in 1960. The first 25 kV AC EMUs, for Kolkata suburban service, began service in September 1962. For continuity, the Howrah–Burdwan section of the Eastern Railway and the Madras Beach–Tambaram section of the Southern Railway were converted to 25 kV AC by 1968. Because of limitations in the DC traction system, a decision was made to convert the electric traction system of the Mumbai suburban rail network of WR and CR from 1.5kV DC to 25 kV AC in 1996–97. The conversion from DC to AC traction was completed in 2012 by Western Railway, and in 2016 by Central Railway. Since then, the entire electrified mainline rail network in India uses 25 kV AC, and DC traction is used only for metros and trams.

Indian Railways announced on 31 March 2017 that the country's entire rail network would be electrified by 2022. This will be a boon for savings for the Government to channelize the investments in modernization of the railway infrastructure. Close to 30 billion units of electricity will be required for railway electrification on an annual basis by 2022, leading to excellent opportunities for IPPs of conventional power.

Signaling and telecommunication 

IR uses a range of signalling technologies and methods to manage its train operations based on traffic density and safety requirements.

Remaining routes are based on absolute block signalling with trains manually controlled by signal men from the signal boxes typically located at stations. Few low density routes still use manual block signalling methods with communication on track clearance based on physical exchange of tokens. In a few sections, intermediate block signalling is provided to further enhance line capacity with minimal investment. As of March 2020, 602 block sections have intermediate block signals on IR.

IR primarily uses coloured signal lights, which replaced semaphores and disc-based signalling (dependent on position or colour). IR uses two-aspect, three-aspect and four (or multiple) aspect color signalling across its network.

Signals at most stations are interlocked using panel interlocking, route-relay interlocking or electronic interlocking methods that eliminate scope for human signalling errors. IR uses track circuiting, and block proving axle counters for train detection. As of March 2017, 6,018 stations across IR have interlocked stations and multi-aspect signalling. Around 99% of key routes (A, B, C and D) have track circuitry or block proving axle counters for automated train detection. Also, IR has about 59,105 route kilometers of optical fiber cable network across India, that is used for train control, voice and data communication. Around  of the route is covered by GSM-R based Mobile Train Radio Communication.

Currently IR uses Centralised Traffic Control (CTC) on the busy Ghaziabad – Kanpur route and real-time train monitoring systems on Mumbai and Kolkata suburban routes.

Links with adjacent countries 
Bangladesh

Bangladesh is connected by the four times a week Maitree Express that runs from Kolkata to Dhaka, weekly Bandhan Express which began running commercial trips between Kolkata and Khulna in November 2017 and biweekly Mitali Express which runs between New Jalpaiguri Junction and Dhaka.

Indian and Bangladeshi governments has started work on a new rail link to ease surface transport. India will build a  railway linking Tripura's capital Agartala with Bangladesh's southeastern city of Akhaura, an important railway junction connected to Chittagong port, resource-rich Sylhet and Dhaka. An agreement to implement the railway project was signed between the then Indian Prime Minister Manmohan Singh and Bangladesh Premier Sheikh Hasina during the latter's visit to India in January 2010. The Indian Railway Construction Company (IRCON) is constructing the new railway tracks on both sides of the border. Of the  rail line,  of tracks fall in Indian territory.

Bhutan

No rail link currently exists with Bhutan as of 2021. However this project was scrapped due to opposition from locals.

Myanmar

No rail link currently exist with Myanmar as of 2021. The Jiribam–Imphal railway line, currently under construction is planned to be extended up to the Indo-Myanmar border at Moreh and to be connected to Tamu on the Myanmar side. Then a missing link needs to be built from Tamu to the existing railhead at Kalay of the Kalay–Pakokku–Chaung U–Myouhaung (Mandalay) line. The construction of this missing link, as per the feasibility study conducted by the Ministry of External Affairs through RITES Ltd, is estimated to cost .

Nepal

Two rail links to Nepal exist as of 2021, with a third under construction. A   line from Raxaul to Sirsiya (near Birgunj) was opened for freight traffic in 2005 as per an agreement made between the Indian and Nepali government on 2004. In 2018 an MoU was signed between the Indian and Nepali government to extend the Raxaul–Birgunj line to the Nepali capital of Kathmandu.

The Jaynagar to Janakpur line was opened on 2020 till Kurtha after which the section was handed over to the Nepal Railways in 2021. Services on the section did not begin on the line until April 2022, owing to staffing problems of Nepal Railways. The Kurtha–Bijalpura construction is underway and it has been proposed to extend the line to Bardibas.

Construction of the  Jogbani to Biratnagar railway line is underway as of 2021. The first phase consisting of  railway line is already completed from Bathnaha to Nepal Customs point and the remaining portion of the project from Nepal Customs point to Biratnagar is under construction.

Pakistan

Two trains operate to Pakistan: the Samjhauta Express between Delhi and Lahore and the Thar Express between Jodhpur and Karachi. However, as of August 2019, they have been cancelled due to the tension over Kashmir.

Sri Lanka

No rail links currently exist with Sri Lanka. However The Boat Mail or Indo-Ceylon Express, Initially Connected Madras (#Chennai_Egmore) to #Thothookudi Via Train & Thothookudi to Colombo via streamer later 1) Madras (#Chennai_Egmore) to Dhanushkodi Pier through Boat Mail or Indo-Ceylon Express 2) Dhanushkodi Pier to Talaimannar via Boat 3) Talaimannar to Colombo.Yalzhpannam (Jaffna)  During 1900's it was a combined train and steamer ferry service between India and Ceylon (now Sri Lanka). Connecting Chennai and Colombo, the system initially utilised a rail-to-sea operation, but changed to a rail-to-sea-to-rail operation. Passengers could buy a single ticket for the journey. Now at present, it runs from Chennai Egmore to Rameswaram via Villuppuram, Kumbakonam, Trichy, Karaikkudi, Devakottai, Manamadurai, Paramakkudi, Ramanathapuram, Mandapam and Pamban.

Tuticorin–Colombo, in the late 19th century, the railway portion of the route within India was from Madras (Chennai) to Tuticorin. At Tuticorin, passengers embarked on the boat mail steamer to Colombo in Ceylon. The train took 21 hours and 50 minutes for the journey from Madras to Tuticorin. The Boat Mail was one of the early trains to be given vestibuled carriages, in 1898.

Dhanushkodi–Talaimannar, in 1914 after the Pamban bridge was built, the train's route changed and it went from Madras to Dhanushkodi. A much shorter ferry service then took the passengers to Talaimannar in Ceylon, from where another train went to Colombo.

Services

Passenger service

Station categories 

IR categorizes its railway stations by commercial importance into three different categories namely Non Suburban Group (NSG), Suburban Group (SG) and Halt Group (HG). These are further subdivided into subcategories based on their commercial importance (namely from NSG 1 to NSG 6, SG 1 to SG 3 and from HG 1 to HG 3). The commercial importance of a station is determined by taking into account its passenger footfall, earnings and strategic importance. These categories are used by IR to decide on and provide the minimum essential amenities required by each station.

Prior to December 2017, the commercial importance of a station was determined only on the basis of its earnings and as such the stations were categorized into seven categories based on it, namely A1, A, B, C, D, E, and F categories.

Travel classes 

IR has several classes of travel, with or without air-conditioning. A train may have one or several classes. Slow passenger trains have only unreserved seating, and the Rajdhani Express, Shatabdi Express, Garib Rath Express, Double Decker Express, Tejas Express, Humsafar Express, Duronto Express, Yuva Express, and Vande Bharat Express have only air-conditioned classes. Fares for all classes differ, and unreserved seating is the least expensive. Fares for the Rajdhani, Duronto, Shatabdi and Vande Bharat Express trains include food. In September 2016, IR introduced dynamic fares for the Rajdhani, Duronto and Shatabdi trains (except 1AC and EC classes) to increase revenue. Long-distance trains usually include a pantry car, and food is served at the passengers' berth or seat. Luxury trains (such as Palace on Wheels) have separate dining cars, but these trains cost as much as—or more than—a five-star hotel room.

A standard passenger rake has four unreserved (general) compartments, two at the front and two at the rear (one of which may be for women). The number of other coaches varies by demand and route. A luggage compartment may be at the front or the rear. On some mail trains, a separate mail coach is attached. Lavatories are communal, and Indian- and Western-style. The classes in operation are (although a train may not have all these classes):

At the rear of the train is the guard's cabin. It contains a transceiver, and is where the guard usually gives the all-clear signal before the train departs. The guard's cabin is also called SLR.

Train types 

Trains are sorted into categories which dictate the number of stops on a route, their priority on the network, and their fare structure. Each express train is identified by a five-digit number. If the first digit in the train number is 1 or 2, they are long-distance express trains. If the first digit is 0, the train is a special train which will operate for a limited period of time with a different fare structure. A first digit of 5 denotes a passenger train.

The second digit indicates the zone operating the train. However, for high-speed trains, the second digit is either 0 or 2 (the first remains 1 or 2). The third digit denotes the division within the zone which is responsible for maintenance and cleanliness, and the last two digits are the train's serial number. The train numbering system was changed from four digits from December 2010, to accommodate the increasing number of trains.

Trains traveling in opposite directions along the same route are usually labelled with consecutive numbers. However, there is considerable variation in train numbers; some zones, such as Central Railway, have a less-systematic method of numbering trains.

Trains are classified by average speed. A faster train has fewer stops (halts) than a slower one, and is usually used for long-distance travel. Most express trains have special names to identify them easily. The names of the trains usually denote the regions they connect, the routes they traverse, or a famous person or tourist spot connected with the train.

Tourism 

Indian Railway operates tourist train or coach services on popular tourist circuits in different regions of the country. The service offers tour packages inclusive of rail travel, local transportation, accommodation, food and guided tours. IR offers various tourist services in this segment including Luxury tourist trains, Semi luxury trains, Buddhist special trains, Bharat Darshan trains, Aastha Circuit trains, and Steam trains.

The Palace on Wheels is a luxury-train service, frequently hauled by a steam locomotive, to promote tourism in Rajasthan. The train has a seven-night, eight-day itinerary on a round trip from New Delhi via Jaipur, Sawai Madhopur and Chittaurgarh, Udaipur, Jaisalmer, Jodhpur, Bharatpur and Agra.

Royal Rajasthan on Wheels covers a number of tourist destinations in Rajasthan. The seven-day, eight-night tour is a round trip from New Delhi's Safdarjung station via Jodhpur, Udaipur and Chittaurgarh, Ranthambore National Park and Jaipur, Khajuraho, Varanasi and Sarnath, and Agra.

Maharajas' Express, a luxury train operated by the Indian Railway Catering and Tourism Corporation (IRCTC), runs on five routes to about 12 destinations across northwest and central India (centered around Rajasthan) from October to April.

The Deccan Odyssey covers tourist destinations in Maharashtra and Goa. Its seven-night, eight-day tour begins in Mumbai and stops at Jaigad Fort, Ganapatipule and Ratnagiri, Sindhudurg, Tarkarli and Sawantwadi, Goa, Kolhapur and Pune (Day 5), Aurangabad and Ellora Caves, and Ajanta Caves and Nashik.

The Golden Chariot is a luxury train service running on two tours: Pride of the South and Splendor of the South.

The Mahaparinirvan Express, an air-conditioned service also known as the Buddhist Circuit Train, is run by the IRCTC for Buddhist pilgrims. Its seven-night, eight-day tour begins in New Delhi and visits Bodh Gaya, Rajgir and Nalanda, Varanasi and Sarnath, Kushinagar and Lumbini, Sravasti, and the Taj Mahal.

The Fairy Queen, a tourist attraction also known as the world's oldest operating steam engine, hauls a luxury train from Delhi to Alwar.

Ticketing 

Until the late 1980s, Indian Railways ticket reservations were made manually. In late 1987, IR began using a computerized ticketing system. The system went online in 1995 to provide current information on status and availability. The ticketing network at stations is computerized with the exception of remote areas.  IR now provides multiple channels for passengers to book tickets between any two train stations in the country.

Reserved tickets may be booked up to 120 days in advance on the Indian Railway Catering and Tourism Corporation website, smartphone apps, SMS, rail reservation counters at train stations, or through private ticket booking counters. A Tatkal train ticket can be booked by passengers who want to travel at short notice with a reserved seat or berth, but such tickets are sold at higher fares than regular advance reservation tickets.

Confirmed reservation tickets will show the passenger and fare details along with berth or seat number(s) allocated to them on the ticket. If the reservation is not available on a particular train, the ticket has a wait-list number. A person with a wait-listed ticket must wait for enough cancellations to obtain a confirmed ticket. If their ticket is not confirmed on the day of departure, they cannot board the train. Reservation against cancellation tickets, between the waiting and confirmed lists, allow a ticket holder to board the train and obtain a seat chosen by a ticket collector after the collector has found a vacant seat.

Unreserved tickets for short distance or unplanned travels may be purchased at stations at any time before departure. Holders of such tickets may only board the general compartments. Suburban networks issue unreserved tickets valid for a limited time or season passes with unlimited travel between two stops for a period of time. Commuters can purchase tickets and season passes at stations or through UTS mobile apps. A valid proof for the purchase of ticket along with photo identification is required to board the train.

India has some of the lowest train fares in the world, and passenger traffic is subsidised by higher-class fares. Discounted tickets are available for senior citizens (over age 60), the differently-abled, students, athletes, and those taking competitive examinations. One compartment of the lowest class of accommodation is earmarked for women on every passenger train. Some berths or seats are also reserved for women or senior citizens.

Freight service 

In the freight segment, IR ferries various commodities and fuels in industrial, consumer, and agricultural segments across the length and breadth of India. IR has historically subsidised the passenger segment with income from the freight business. As a result, freight services are unable to compete with other modes of transport on both cost and speed of delivery, leading to continuous erosion of market share. To counter this downward trend, IR has started new initiatives in freight segments including upgrading of existing goods sheds, attracting private capital to build multi-commodity multi-modal logistics terminals, changing container sizes, operating time-tabled freight trains, and tweaking with the freight pricing/product mix. Also, end-to-end integrated transport solutions such as roll-on, roll-off (RORO) service, a road-rail system pioneered by Konkan Railway Corporation in 1999 to carry trucks on flatbed trailers, is now being extended to other routes across India.

Perhaps the game changer for IR in the freight segment are the new dedicated freight corridors that are expected to be completed by 2020. Also, they will free-up capacity on dense passenger routes and will allow IR to run more trains at higher speeds. Additional corridors are being planned to augment the freight infrastructure in the country.

UNESCO World Heritage Sites 

IR maintains two UNESCO World Heritage Sites: the Chhatrapati Shivaji Maharaj Terminus, Mumbai, and the "Mountain Railways of India". The latter are three rail lines in different parts of India: the Darjeeling Himalayan Railway, a  narrow-gauge railway in the Lesser Himalayas of West Bengal; the Nilgiri Mountain Railway, a  rack railway in the Nilgiri Hills of Tamil Nadu, and the Kalka-Shimla Railway, a  narrow-gauge railway in the Siwalik Hills of Himachal Pradesh.

Railway Grievance and Suggestion Portal
In 2019, to tackle and resolve the problems of passengers of Indian Railways, the Ministry launched a portal named RailMadad. According to Railway Minister Ashwini Vaishnaw in a written reply to a question in Rajya Sabha in 2021, all complaints have been resolved within 72 hours and people gave a satisfactory feedback.

Future 

The Indian government plans to invest  to upgrade IR by 2020.

Infrastructure modernisation projects include high-speed rail, with the first Ahmedabad-Mumbai train in operation in 2022; redevelopment of 400 stations by monetizing  of spare railway land under a ₹10,70,000($134 billion)  plan; doubling tracks to reduce congestion and delays while improving safety; the refurbishing of 12- to 15-year-old coaches at the Carriage Rehabilitation Workshop in Bhopal to enhance passenger amenities and fire safety; Global Positioning System (GPS)-enabled tracking of trains to improve safety and service; Digital India-driven  digitalisation of the railway to improve efficiency and reduce cost; rainwater harvesting, with 1885 systems installed by December 2016; and reforestation of railway land and along the tracks.

All routes will be electrified to save on imported fuel costs. Off-the-grid solar-powered trains are planned with the installation of one gigawatt of solar and 130 megawatts of wind power between 2017 and 2022; India introduced the world's first solar-powered train and 50 coaches with rooftop solar farms in June 2017. Initial assessments of this experiment have been positive. Rooftop solar electricity is planned at stations to reduce long-term fuel costs and protect the environment, and sustainable LED lighting at all the stations was completed by March 2018 which saves Rs 500 million per annum in electricity bills. Locomotive factories have been modernised, including two new factories in Bihar: an electric locomotive factory in Madhepura and a diesel locomotive factory in Marhaura, and 2,285 bio-toilets were introduced from April to July 2014. A  partnership with Alstom to supply 800 electric locomotives from 2018 to 2028 was announced.

All the unstaffed level crossings had been eliminated by Jan 2019, and staffed level crossings are being progressively replaced by overbridges and underbridges. Other safety projects include the extension of an automated fire alarm system, first introduced on Rajdhani Express trains in 2013, to all air-conditioned coaches; and 6,095 GPS-enabled Fog Pilot Assistance System railway signalling devices (replacing the practice of placing firecrackers on tracks to alert train drivers) installed in 2017 in four zones: Northern, North Central, North Eastern and North Western; and replacing ICF coach with LHB coach.

In an unprecedented move, the railways had suspended the services of all passenger trains for 48 days after the lockdown was announced by the PM on 24 March 2020. Its freight trains however continued to run during this period. This was the first time in its entire history that lifeline of the nation was stopped. On 12 May 2020, in first phase, Railways started the Rajdhani Express for 15 cities and began the reservation for the same via IRCTC website an evening before.

Indian Railways is planning to seek investments from private firms to operate passenger trains for the first time. Ministry of Railways identified 109 origin-destination routes via 151 trains asked private companies to submit their interest. Private companies may operate trains by April 2023. This will incorporate modern trains with technological advancements like less maintenance, reduce travel time and create employment. 151 trains will be operated by the by private entities. Each train shall have minimum 16 coaches.

Government of India is building the world's highest rail bridge over the river Chenab, which will connect the Indian State of Jammu and Kashmir with the rest of India. It is set to be completed in 2022. According to the media, per a local government official: "This is the tallest railway bridge in the world and the maximum designed wind speed for the bridge is 266 kmph".

Commemorative stamps
Stamps released by India Post (by year) -

See also 
 List of railway stations in India
 List of railway companies in India
 High-speed rail in India
 List of high-speed railway lines in India

Notes

References

Further reading 

 Aguiar, Marian. Tracking Modernity: India's Railway and the Culture of Mobility  (University of Minnesota Press; 2011) 226 pages; draws on literature, film, and other realms to explore the role of the railway in the Indian imagination. excerpt and text search
 Bear, Linda. Lines of the Nation: Indian Railway Workers, Bureaucracy, and the Intimate Historical Self (2007)   excerpt and text search
 Hurd, John, and Ian J. Kerr. India’s Railway History: A Research Handbook (Brill: 2012), 338pp
 Kerr, Ian J. Railways in Modern India (2001) excerpt and text search
 Kerr, Ian J. Engines of Change: The Railroads That Made India (2006)
 Kumar, Sudhir, and Shagun Mehrotra. Bankruptcy to Billions: How the Indian Railways Transformed Itself (2009)
 Macpherson, W. J. "Investment in Indian Railways, 1845-1875." Economic History Review, 8#2, 1955, pp. 177–186 online

External links 

 Official Website
 eTicket Reservation
 Glossary

 
Railway companies of India
Companies based in New Delhi
Government-owned companies of India
Railway companies established in 1845
Indian companies established in 1845
Government-owned railway companies